Hasan Zaglam, (Arabic Maher Dahman (حسن مختار زقلام; is an auditor and a Libyan politician born in the city of Tripoli in 1945. He was named Minister of Finance on 22 November 2011 by Abdurrahim El-Keib.

References

1945 births
Living people
People from Tripoli, Libya
Libyan Sunni Muslims
Finance ministers of Libya
Government ministers of Libya
Members of the National Transitional Council
Members of the Interim Government of Libya
People of the First Libyan Civil War
University of Benghazi alumni
Indiana State University alumni